The Mesopotamian Social Sciences Academy is a co-educational university in Qamishli, a city in de facto autonomous region, the Democratic Federation of Northern Syria. The academy opened in 2013 offering classes in criticism and self-criticism, the democratic system and Kurdish language. 

The school year has three terms, lasting 3-4 months each. The curriculum consists mainly of history and sociology classes. Jineoloji is also taught there. Teaching occurs mainly in Kurdish.

There was a book donation drive organised early in the life of the university, which, amongst others, was donated to by AK Press.

See also
University of Afrin
University of Rojava

References

External links
Official Facebook page of the Mesopotamian Social Sciences Academy

Educational institutions established in 2014
Education in the Autonomous Administration of North and East Syria
Alternative education
Libertarian socialism
Women's rights in Syria
2014 establishments in Syria